The Ngo River or La Ngo, is a river of New Caledonia. It is a stream which flows into Pirogues Bay.

See also
List of rivers of New Caledonia

References

Rivers of New Caledonia